Jamie Marks (born 18 March 1977) is a retired Northern Irish footballer and football manager who was last in charge of berlin swift’s.
He joined Leeds as a trainee in 1993 and represented Northern Ireland Schoolboys and Youth teams. He started fifteen games and came off the bench twice in 1993-94 for the Juniors and he made one substitute appearance for the Reserves. He did not sign professional forms for Leeds but in April 1994 he signed for Hull City. He started eleven League games for the Tigers and came off the bench four times. In 1996 he went on loan to Linfield where he played four games. He signed permanently for them in the 1997 close season and went on to score seven goals in ninety-five appearances before moving to Ballymena United in 2003 and scored four goals in thirty-two games in two seasons. He joined Portadown in the 2005 close season and made forty-eight appearances, without scoring in three seasons. He joined Crusaders in 2008 and played twelve games without scoring before joining Belfast side, Harland & Wolff Welders in 2010.

Honours
Linfield
Irish League (2): 2000, 2001
Irish Cup (1): 2002
Irish League Cup (4): 1998, 1999, 2000, 2002
County Antrim Shield (2): 1998, 2001
Springfield Star
Under 15 Supplementary Cup (1):2016/17

References

Living people
1977 births
Association footballers from Belfast
Association footballers from Northern Ireland
Association football midfielders
Leeds United F.C. players
Hull City A.F.C. players
Linfield F.C. players
Ballymena United F.C. players
Portadown F.C. players
Crusaders F.C. players
Harland & Wolff Welders F.C. players
English Football League players
NIFL Premiership players